Events in the year 1901 in Bulgaria.

Incumbents

Events 

 28 January – Parliamentary elections were held in the country. Despite receiving only the third highest number of votes, the Progressive Liberal Party emerged as the largest party in Parliament with 40 of the 164 seats. Voter turnout was 42.7%.

References 

 
1900s in Bulgaria
Years of the 20th century in Bulgaria
Bulgaria
Bulgaria